The Nancy Drew Mystery Stories is the long-running "main" series of the Nancy Drew franchise, which was published under the pseudonym Carolyn Keene. There are 175 novels — plus 34 revised stories — that were published between 1930 and 2003 under the banner; Grosset & Dunlap published the first 56, and 34 revised stories, while Simon & Schuster published the series beginning with volume 57.

A spinoff, the Nancy Drew Files, ran concurrently from 1986 to 1997. In 2003, Simon & Schuster announced that Nancy Drew Mystery Stories would end and be replaced by a new, more contemporary series titled Nancy Drew: Girl Detective. Launched in 2004, the series was panned in comparisons to its predecessor, and ended in 2012. The Nancy Drew Diaries was launched in its place in 2013, and has received mixed reviews.

Publishing history
Mildred Wirt Benson is credited with writing 23 of the first 30 novels in the series. Other authors contributed, as well, but in 1959, Edward Stratemeyer's daughter, Harriet Adams, began rewriting the earlier books in the series, sometimes substituting entirely new plots while retaining the same title.

In the Harriet Adams revisions, Nancy is depicted as a less impulsive, less headstrong girl of Stratemeyer and Mildred's vision, to a milder, more sedate and refined girl— "more sugar and less spice", with an extensive wardrobe and a more charitable outlook. Helen Corning appears older, perhaps in preparation for her "write-out" after volume 4 of the revised series (no explanation was made in the original series) and to introduce Bess and her cousin George. Perceived racial stereotypes — and, arguably, characters of color period — were omitted. Action increased significantly and became faster-paced. Greater developmental detail was given to Nancy and her home.

In 1979, after a court battle between the Stratemeyer Syndicate and Grosset & Dunlap, the original publishers (in hardback) of the first 56 Nancy Drew titles, publication rights to new stories were granted to Simon & Schuster. Titles from #57, The Triple Hoax (1979), were thereafter published primarily in paperback.

Books #57–78 were initially printed under Simon & Schuster's Children's imprint Wanderer as digest sized paperbacks (although some were also later published in the regular paperback format, which was also the format of choice for some foreign editions, especially the UK Armada releases). Limited numbers of hardback editions are also known to have been produced, mostly for libraries.

The titles were initially presented in set cover format referred to as the "Arch" design, with most covers drawn by Ruth Sanderson. The 22 titles were also reprinted under the Wanderer imprint in a new "checkerboard" design before the series moved, from #79 on, to the new Minstrel imprint, whereupon they received still newer covers in the "checkerboard" design. The series ultimately moved again to Simon & Schuster's Aladdin Paperbacks imprint beginning with #164, undergoing two further cover revamps, "White" and "Paint".

Titles

Grosset & Dunlap
The Nancy Drew Mystery Stories were first published in the United States in 1930 by Grosset & Dunlap in a series of hardbacks. Revision of all titles through Volume 34 began in 1959.

Simon & Schuster
In 1979, the Nancy Drew books began to be published by Wanderer Books Simon & Schuster in paperback format. Though formatted differently from the original 56-volume series which continued under Grosset & Dunlap's control, these new books were published under the Nancy Drew Mystery Stories banner. These books feature increasingly contemporary cover illustrations and some books have multiple versions of the cover art.

To collectors of Nancy Drew and Hardy Boys books, books in the original series published at Simon & Schuster are called "Digests". This is due to the books resembling Digest-size paperbacks, differing from Grosset & Dunlap's hardcover books (one of the reasons why Adams switched to Simon & Schuster was because Grosset & Dunlap did not like this move, while Simon & Schuster agreed to it).

In 2005, the first eight volumes from the Wanderer section (#57-64) were republished by Grosset & Dunlap, as a special promotion for the celebration of Nancy Drew's 75th anniversary. These republications went out of print in 2013.

Wanderer editions
The Triple Hoax was originally listed as the next book at the end of The Thirteenth Pearl. Grosset & Dunlap continued to list this until they lost a court case against the Syndicate and Simon & Schuster in May 1980. The book was later revised to eliminate The Triple Hoax. However, they later published this book — and the seven after that — in 2005, with the permission and collaboration of Simon & Schuster, in celebration of Nancy Drew's 75th anniversary.

The main plot, formula, and continuity of the books remained similar to the original Grosset & Dunlap books still being published at the time. Harriet Adams was still involved in the Syndicate, even after she stopped writing the books in 1980. Simon & Schuster rejected her original manuscript for The Secret in the Old Lace, with the story being rewritten by Nancy Axelrad. After she died in 1982, the Syndicate continued with five of its partners (Adams' remaining three children, plus authors Nancy Axelrod and Lilo Wuenn), until its sale to Simon & Schuster in 1987.

During this period, the Syndicate began to hire new, younger writers, including Sharon Wagner, Richard Ballad, and James Duncan Lawrence. Ballad's books — Captive Witness and The Sinister Omen — were all originally written for The Hardy Boys, but were rewritten for unknown reasons. The Emerald-Eyed Cat Mystery also falls in this category.

The final two books (#77 and #78) were "backdoor pilots" for the spin-off The Nancy Drew Files, which began in 1986. Due to this, and the sale of the Stratemeyer Syndicate, the series went on a two-year hiatus to retool the series.

Minstrel editions
After volume 78, the series took a -year hiatus due to the sale of the Stratemeyer Syndicate to Simon & Schuster, and to begin The Nancy Drew Files spin-off. At this point, book packager Mega-Books took over the series, and hired different ghostwriters for the job (many of whom are still unknown). The ghostwriters who are known are ones who have either been discovered through other resources or have publicly revealed themselves as a ghostwriter for the series. The series also gained Anne Greenberg as the new editor; Greenberg would oversee the series for the next 16 years, and become one of the most influential Nancy Drew editors that helped the books continue until the 21st century.

Due to the cancellation of The Nancy Drew Files in 1997, Simon & Schuster rewrote several unpublished manuscripts into books for the original series. These books include: The Wild Cat Crime (#141), The E-mail Mystery (#144), and The Case of the Captured Queen (#148).

The writing style of these books took a different direction than the books of the Syndicate; modern technology is mentioned (making the books seem somewhat dated very quickly), continuity errors are common, and the books become shorter (reducing the books from a 20-chapter/180-page format to a 16-chapter/150-page format). Characters Burt Eddleton and Dave Evans are eliminated entirely ( because of this, some fans were disappointed) and Nancy mostly has a habit of rotating between George, Bess, and Ned. This setup creates a more realistic layout, rather than having all six drop everything to join Nancy. In the late 1990s, continuity errors and text errors became more common.

Aladdin editions
With the new millennium, the series changed publishers to the Aladdin subdivision of Simon & Schuster. With declining sales, and the departure of longtime editor Anne Greenberg, Simon & Schuster ended the original series in November 2003.

The books published in 2003 show a sharp decline in quality compared to earlier books, as the new editors focused on preparing the new Nancy Drew, Girl Detective series. Continuity errors are rampant throughout these books: in No Strings Attached and Danger on the Great Lakes (both written by George Edward Stanley), Nancy and her friends are 17, and are on summer vacation; Ned works at a company; and George has chestnut hair (when she is usually a brunette). In Werewolf in a Winter Wonderland, Ned is suddenly blond, and it is hinted at that Nancy might be in college. Numerous typographic errors and mistakes are also found throughout these books.

Foreign publication

United Kingdom
The Nancy Drew Mystery Series was published in a series of hardbacks and paperbacks in the UK, starting in 1971 and 1973. The British publisher was Collins Publishing, and its paperback imprint Armada Books (which also published the Hardy Boys and Three Investigators, among other series'). When the Nancy Drew series was published in England, the order was changed significantly and the titles' numbering was revised from the American standard.

Thus, the original fifty-six American Grosset & Dunlap-published titles become the first fifty UK titles, with #57-78 being published as #51-72. Collins, therefore, had a deal in place with both American publishers and, indeed, were obliged "for contractual reasons" to publish some of the later Simon & Schuster titles before some of the Grosset & Dunlap ones. Collins/Armada published the twenty-two Simon & Schuster/Wanderer titles in sequence, albeit off by six, and then finished publishing the six "missing" Grosset & Dunlap titles (including the first, The Secret of the Old Clock).

The twenty-two (US) Wanderer-imprint titles were produced between 1979 and 1985, after which the main Nancy Drew Mystery Stories went on a short hiatus. During this time, Simon & Schuster began publishing The Nancy Drew Files series for older teenagers, and subsequently re-aligned the 'main' series, moving it to a new imprint in 1987, with The Double Horror of Fenley Place, the first Nancy Drew title published under the American Minstrel imprint. Accordingly, after publishing twenty-two Wanderer (and seventy-eight overall) titles in the main Nancy Drew series, the Collins/Armada licence terminated in June 1992. The following month, Simon & Schuster itself began publishing the more recent Minstrel-imprint US titles under their Pocket Books UK imprint, starting with the now numerically aligned Volume #79. For contractual reasons, Armada was "obliged to publish No. 51 onwards before publishing Nos. 41-50".

Other formats

Special editions and reprints

The Reader's Club or Cameo editions
Nancy Drew was issued as a book club feature, the Nancy Drew Reader's Club, from 1959 to early 1961. In all, twelve volumes were issued, six in 1959 and six in 1960. These volumes were issued with new illustrations by artist Polly Bolian. The volumes matched Grosset & Dunlap's other Doubleday Book Club publication, Young Library. A full color jacket illustration was repeated as the frontispiece, and double-page pen and ink drawings highlighted the texts. References or notices for other volumes, and volume numbering, was removed from the text and the jackets.

Plans for additional titles were abandoned after two years and the series ceased publication in early 1961. The volumes are highly desired by today's collectors due to their original artwork and the scarcity of their dust jackets, made on inferior, lightweight matte paper instead of heavier-gauge glossy paper used on other editions. The books with jackets are considered scarce, those with a 1960 date being much more difficult to find by collectors.

Book Club Editions
Nancy Drew was issued in the yellow-spine picture format, as a book club, in 1962. The back covers were solid yellow, and spines feature no volume numbers. "Book Club Edition" appears on the title page. Only Volumes 1–32 were issued. In the 1970s, a book club offer was available directly from the publisher, but these volumes were exactly the same as regularly purchased volumes; they were simply mailed on schedule to the subscriber.

Twin Thriller
Several Nancy Drew books were published as two-volumes-in-one in the 1970s. Covers featured geometric clover designs on lilac grey, with a vignette from one of the two volumes' original cover art. All of the volumes are sequential, i.e., 1–2, 3–4, except for the final two issued. Volumes 17 and 24 appear together as one, as they were not revised until the mid-1970s.

Applewood Books reprints
Applewood Books began reprinting facsimile editions of the early Nancy Drew and Hardy Boys in 1991.  The books feature the original dust jacket art, original illustrations (although not scattered through the text), original texts, and duplication binding of the early Nancy Drew format. Many of the volumes contain forewords from adult author fans of the series, such as Sara Paretsky. Applewood issued original series titles up to #21, The Secret in the Old Attic.  Although Volumes 22 and 23, The Clue in the Crumbling Wall and The Mystery of the Tolling Bell, respectively, were featured in the 2006–2007 catalogue, these additional titles were not ultimately published as company representatives stated that sales of later volumes had tapered and plans to extend the line were discontinued in 2007.

Literarture Nancy Drew Dust Jacket Collection reprints
In late 2006, Literarture, licensed by publisher Simon and Schuster, began releasing prints of classic Nancy Drew dust jacket artwork by Russell Tandy, Bill Gillies and Rudy Nappi derived from pristine vintage art elements and, in some cases, following extensive research, the original paintings themselves. The jackets, issued as limited-edition offset lithographs, can either be framed or wrapped comfortably around most series book formats. The line was discontinued after many dust jackets were offered for sale.

Nancy Drew originals
In early 2007, Grosset and Dunlap began retailing special volumes of Nancy Drew mysteries with original artwork but revised content in different product assortments and packaging.

Notes

References

 
Series of books
Juvenile series
Series of children's books
American novels adapted into television shows

fi:Paula Drew